Bristol Virginia Public Schools (BVPS) is the school division for Bristol, Virginia.

Schools
Secondary:
 Virginia High School
 Virginia Middle School

Elementary:
 Highland View Elementary School
 Joseph Van Pelt Elementary School
 Stonewall Jackson Elementary School
 Washington-Lee Elementary School

See also
 Bristol Tennessee City Schools - School district of the majority of Bristol, Tennessee
 Tennessee High School - The high school of that district

External links
 Bristol Virginia Public Schools
School divisions in Virginia
Education in Bristol, Virginia